Mishmar Ayalon (lit. Ayalon Guard) is a moshav in central Israel. Located between Latrun and Ramla on the old Jerusalem-Tel Aviv road, it falls under the jurisdiction of Gezer Regional Council.

Etymology
The moshav overlooks the Biblical valley of Ayalon (Joshua 10:12), after which it is named.

History
The moshav was founded in 1949 by a gar'in of Jewish Holocaust survivors from Czechoslovakia. The land had previously belonged to the depopulated Palestinian Arab village of Al-Qubab.

The Lehi forest is located in the moshav. In 2005 a monument to Lehi fighters (the Stern Gang) was erected in the village.

The moshav's main industry is agriculture, particularly focusing on fruit, vegetables and dairy farming known for their high quality cheese.

References

Czech-Jewish culture in Israel
Slovak-Jewish culture in Israel
Moshavim
Populated places established in 1949
Populated places in Central District (Israel)
1949 establishments in Israel